Fritz Müller (1821–1897) was a German biologist active in Brazil.

Fritz Müller may also refer to:

Fritz Müller (doctor) (1834–1895), Swiss doctor, zoologist, and herpetologist
Fritz Mueller (1907–2001), German engineer
Fritz Müller (glaciologist) (1926–1980), Swiss, gave name to Muller Ice Shelf
Fritz Müller (pilot), former German Luftwaffe flying ace
Fritz Müller (politician) (1920-2001)
Fritz Müller (racing driver) (born 1941), German former racing driver in 1993 24 Hours of Le Mans
Fritz Müller (rugby union), German rugby union player
Fritz Müller (typographer)